Pholidobolus paramuno is a species of lizard in the family Gymnophthalmidae. It is endemic to Colombia.

References

Pholidobolus
Reptiles of Colombia
Endemic fauna of Colombia
Reptiles described in 2018
Taxa named by Juan P. Hurtado-Gómez
Taxa named by Juan Camilo Arredondo Salgar
Taxa named by Pedro M. Sales-Nunes
Taxa named by Juan M. Daza